Bryotropha sattleri is a moth of the family Gelechiidae. It is found in Portugal, Spain, France, Sardinia, Italy, Greece, the Aegean Islands, Crete and Morocco.

The wingspan is 14–16 mm. The forewings are pale grey to ochreous brown. The base with an indistinct basal spot followed by indistinct dark costal and tornal blotches. The hindwings are pale brown, but darker towards the apex. Adults have been recorded on wing from April to October.

References

Moths described in 2003
sattleri
Moths of Europe
Moths of Africa